Milen Georgiev Vasilev (born 17 May 1988) is a Bulgarian footballer, who plays as a winger.

Career
Vasilev played for Botev Vratsa during the 2016–17 season, but was released in March 2017 due to disciplinary issues.  In March 2018, he joined North-West Third League side Spartak Pleven but was released at the end of the season.

References

External links

Profile at LevskiSofia.info

Living people
1988 births
People from Botevgrad
Bulgarian footballers
Association football wingers
First Professional Football League (Bulgaria) players
Second Professional Football League (Bulgaria) players
Macedonian First Football League players
OFC Sliven 2000 players
PFC Minyor Pernik players
PFC Levski Sofia players
PFC Slavia Sofia players
PFC Chernomorets Burgas players
PFC Marek Dupnitsa players
SFC Etar Veliko Tarnovo players
FC Botev Vratsa players
FK Pelister players
PFC Spartak Pleven players
Bulgarian expatriate footballers
Bulgarian expatriate sportspeople in North Macedonia
Expatriate footballers in North Macedonia
Sportspeople from Sofia Province